Chen Chang-ming (born 2 December 1955) is a Taiwanese long-distance runner. He competed in the marathon at the 1984 Summer Olympics.

References

1955 births
Living people
Athletes (track and field) at the 1984 Summer Olympics
Taiwanese male long-distance runners
Taiwanese male marathon runners
Olympic athletes of Taiwan
Place of birth missing (living people)